Your Pilot's License is a book published in 2003 by Jerry A. Eichenberger. It was published by McGraw Hill as part of the Practical Flying Series. The book details aspects of training, such as practice maneuvers and cross country planning. It is written in a Laymen's style for beginners to aviation.

References

2003 non-fiction books
Aviation books